Gouzens is a commune in the Haute-Garonne department in southwestern France.

Geography
The commune is bordered by two other communes: Montesquieu-Volvestre to the east and finally by Montberaud to the west.

Population

See also
Communes of the Haute-Garonne department

References

Communes of Haute-Garonne